This is a list of Latvian football transfers in the 2011 summer transfer window by club. Only transfers of the Virsliga and 1 liga are included.

All transfers mentioned are shown in the external links at the bottom of the page. If you wish to insert a transfer that isn't mentioned there, please add a reference.

Latvian Higher League

Skonto 

In:

Out:

Ventspils 

In:

Out:

Liepājas Metalurgs 

In:

Out:

Daugava 

In:

Out:

Jūrmala-VV 

In:

Out:

Jelgava 

In:

Out:

Olimps 

In:

Out:

Gulbene 

In:

Out:

Jūrmala 

In:

Out:

Latvian First League

Rēzeknes BJSS 

In:

Out:

Ventspils-2 

In:

Out:

Rīgas Futbola skola 

In:

Out:

Liepājas Metalurgs-2 

In:

Out:

METTA/LU 

In:

Out:

Valmiera 

In:

Out:

Auda 

In:

Out:

Daugava-2 

In:

Out:

Spartaks 

In:

Out:

Tukums 2000 

In:

Out:

Jelgava-2 

In:

Out:

Varavīksne 

In:

Out:

Ogre/FK33 

In:

Out:

References

External links 
 Official site of Latvian Football Federation 

2011
Latvia
Football
transfers